Patrick Keith Smith (born October 20, 1961) is a retired Major League Baseball shortstop. He played during two seasons at the major league level for the New York Yankees. He was drafted by the Yankees in the 15th round of the 1979 amateur draft. Smith played his first professional season with their Class A (Short Season) Oneonta Yankees in 1979, and his last season with the New York Mets' Triple-A Tidewater Tides, in 1992.

References

1961 births
Living people
New York Yankees players
Nashville Sounds players
Baseball players from Los Angeles
Major League Baseball shortstops
Oneonta Yankees players
Tidewater Tides players
Colorado Springs Sky Sox players
Columbus Clippers players
Denver Zephyrs players
El Paso Diablos players
Fort Lauderdale Yankees players
Greensboro Hornets players
Richmond Braves players
Vancouver Canadians players
Wei Chuan Dragons players
American expatriate baseball players in Canada
American expatriate baseball players in Taiwan